Newtyle Hill is a mountainous landform in the Sidlaw Hills in Angus, Scotland  The vicinity has elements of prehistory including presence of the Eassie Stone, a Pictish stone dating to the Dark Ages.

It is not to be confused with a hill of the same name 2 km east of Dunkeld.

See also
 Hatton Hill

Line notes

References
 United Kingdom Ordnance Survey Mapy, Sheet 53, Blairgowrie
 C.Michael Hogan, Eassie Stone, The Megalithic Portal, ed. A. Burnham, 7 October 2007 

Mountains and hills of Angus, Scotland